Arvin High School is located in Arvin, California, United States and is part of the Kern High School District.

Arvin High School was established in 1949, and is located in the southern part of the San Joaquin Valley. Arvin High serves approximately 2,458 students in grades 9–12. The school is composed of three agriculturally based communities: Arvin, Lamont and Weedpatch. The nearest colleges are: California State University, Bakersfield, located 18 miles from the high school and Bakersfield Community College located 17 miles away.

Arvin High School has 115 classroom teachers, two directors, two program coordinators, five administrators, six counselors and 115 support personnel. The school is one of eighteen comprehensive, four-year high schools in the Kern High School District.

The school principal is Ed Watts; the assistant principal of administration is Robert Moore; and the assistant principal of instruction is Dr. Gabriel Ramirez. Up until 2016, the school principal was Carlos Sardo; the assistant principal of instruction is Ed Watts; the assistant principal of administration is Robert Moore; the dean of students is Mary Alice Finn; the dean of instruction is Michael Akey.

Schedule
AHS switched to the A/B block schedule during the 2006-2007 year in which students attend periods 1, 3, and 5 on one day (red) and then 2, 4, and 6 on the next day (white) Monday through Friday. The A/B block schedule has added nearly 6,500 instructional minutes per year to the regular instructional calendar by decreasing passing periods and without adding more or longer days. Each class period is 120 minutes in duration; instruction and leadership is centered on meeting the needs of the individual student and place greater emphasis and test scores, it's founded on professional collaboration.

History
Arvin High School was opened in 1949.  Many of the original students came to the Arvin, California area during the Dust Bowl era as depicted in the book The Grapes of Wrath by John Steinbeck.

The first Arvin High graduating class was in 1952.

Awards and recognition
Arvin High School achieved California Distinguished School status in 1994.

Since 2009, Arvin High has been named overall winner of the 20th Congressional District "We the People: The Citizen and the Constitution" competition.

In 2011 Arvin High School's manufacturing program was honored as "program of the year" for the state of California.

For the 2012–2013 school year, Arvin High School's "We the People: The Citizen and the Constitution" participated in the national competition; winning the 'Best Western States Team.' 

The Winter Guard program won the PPAACC "AAA" Championships in 2012 and the SJVCGPR "A Bronze" Championships in 2013.

Athletics
AHS is a member of the South Sequoia League of the CIF Central Section.

Frank Barle Stadium
In 1980 the stadium was named after retired 31-year AHS athletic director Frank John Barle by the Kern High School District. This was the first time that a stadium, field, or building was named after a living recipient. Mr. Barle was a member of the 1934 and 1935 University of Minnesota Golden Gophers college football national championship teams.

Football
1967 SSL Champs Valley Finalists
1971 SSL Champs Valley Finalists
1974 EYL Champs First Yosemite Division Championship (Large School) in school history
1975 Yosemite Division semi finalists. Lost to eventual champion Edison 27–21. The only points Edison allowed in the playoffs.
1976 EYL Champs Defeated #1 Valley ranked West High 15–6 in pre-season.
1979 EYL Champs
1987 SYL runner up. Defeated Bakersfield High 27–18 in the final game. Bakersfield's last loss before a 39-game win streak.
1990 - Arvin High captured the South Sequoia League title and defeated Fresno-San Joaquin Memorial 21–7 to win the Central Section CIF Sequoia Division Valley
2006- SSL Champs
 2016 Undefeated in losses

Baseball
1972 SSL Champs Valley runner ups.
1983 SYL champs. Yosemite Semi Finalists
1992 SSL champs. First SSL team to go undefeated 15–0 in league.
1993 SYL champs. Yosemite Semi Finalists lost to National Champion Bullard 6–3.
1994 Yosemite Division finalists. Beat #1 team in the state Clovis West in the semi finals. Lost to Hanford 6–5 in the finals.
1995 SWYL Champs
2018 Won Little League All Stars

Tennis
2011 The Arvin High School boys tennis team defeated Corcoran High School 5–4 to win their first Central Section CIF Sequoia Division Valley Championship.

Volleyball
2005 The AHS volleyball squad went 9–1 in league play to capture a share of the South Sequoia League title.

Basketball
2020 Arvin girls basketball team won the title in South Sequoia League record with 11–1.
2020 Arvin girls basketball became the first ever team to play for the D-3 Central Section Valley Title and was Runner-Up with an overall season record of 28–6. Hosted a Home State Playoff game.
2016-17 Arvin girls basketball team 2nd year in a row SSL champs and undefeated in league.
2015-16 Arvin girls basketball team SSL champs and undefeated in league.
2009 Arvin girls basketball team won their second South Sequoia League title in three years.
2007 - Arvin High girls basketball squad captured the South Sequoia League title.
1976 Undefeated EYL Champs - Lost in Valley D-1 Final 4 44–39 to BHS
1971 SSL Champs Defeated Bullard 61–50 at Bullard to make D-1 final 4
1970 SSL champs
1968 SSL champs
1967 SSL Champs

Wrestling
2004 and 2005 - Arvin High won the South Sequoia League wrestling title in Raymond Menchaca first year as head coach.
1987-88 Arvin High School defeated Bakersfield High school to win the South Yosemite League title.

Soccer
2007 - The Arvin High boys soccer team went 7–1 in league play to capture the South Sequoia League title. 
2017 - Arvin High Girls soccer team CIF D6 Valley 2nd place team. "Day of Champions" March 25, 2017
2019 - The Arvin High Girls soccer team went 11–1 in league play to capture the South Sequoia League title for the first time in history.
2019- The Arvin High Girls soccer team won the CIF Central Section Division 6 Valley Title for the first time in history against Fresno Christian
2019- The Arvin Girls Soccer team won the first round of the CIF State Southern Playoff Regional Game for the first time in history at home against Venice High School
2020- The Arvin High Girls soccer team won the CIF Central Section Division 6 Valley Title against Frazier Mountain Back to Back

Performing arts

Crimson Bear Brigade

The school band became known as the Arvin High Crimson Bear Brigade in 1979. The Crimson Bear Brigade performed at the opening ceremonies for the baseball portion of the 1984 Summer Olympics in Los Angeles, California.

The Crimson Bear Brigade was under the direction of Kevin J. Brady from 2012 to 2013.  The Crimson Bear Brigade also features the current undefeated AAA Championship Winterguard under the direction of Mr. Eric Alvarez and award-winning Winter Percussion under the direction of Mr. Gus Villegas with the help of Lezlie Telan, Karina Garcia and Ruben Ibarra.

The Crimson Bear Brigade won numerous awards for the 2012 marching season, including 1st Place AA Marching Band at the Stockdale Band Spectacular, 2nd in Percussion, and 1st in Colorguard.

The Winterguard program received the title of Champions for the 2013 season at the SJVCGPR for A Class Bronze on Saturday April 7, 2013.  They won the Bronze for PPAACC 2013 AA.

The Brigade is now under the direction of AHS alumnus Charlie Vasquez, who graduated from CSUB.

Student body

Enrollment as of 2011: 2458

Notable alumni
 Dallas Grider -  Former head football coach for the Bakersfield College Renegades. While playing linebacker for two seasons at UCLA he recovered a critical onside kick that led to UCLA's final touchdown and their first Rose Bowl victory over Michigan State.
Shannon Grove - California CA Assemblywoman for the 32nd district (Republican).
 Jim Kennedy - Major League Baseball player for the St. Louis Cardinals. Originally signed as a free agent by the New York Yankees.
 Junior Kennedy - Major League Baseball player for the Cincinnati Reds and Chicago Cubs. Drafted by the Baltimore Orioles in the 1st round with the 10th overall pick.
 Marcos Reyes - Percussionist with the funk group War.  Was a guest star with the group on the George Lopez show. 
 Tommy Rowland -  Star defensive tackle and end for the University of Nevada, Las Vegas from 1968 to 1971. Started every game in his four-year career @ UNLV. Led the team in tackles in 1969 (125) and 1971 (134) from the defensive line. Recorded 37 career sacks. Was named MVP of the Defense in 1970 and 1971. Played pro football two years with the Las Vegas Casinos (1972–1973). Was invited to NFL camp by the Minnesota Vikings and played entire pre-season. Was offered a free agent contract by the New York Jets in 1975. Elected into the UNLV Athletic Hall of Fame in 1994. Elected into the Arvin High School Athletic Hall of Fame in 2010.
 Bernard Tarver - Former running back and lead kick off returner for the University of Southern California. Won a national championship and two Rose Bowls while at USC.
 John Tarver - National Football League player for the New England Patriots and Philadelphia Eagles.

Trivia
in 1985 scenes from the movie Cavegirl were shot on the Arvin High School campus.

Below Arvin High School is a large Cold War bomb shelter constructed in the early 1950s. At the time it was the largest bomb shelter in California, equipped with an operating room, 60-bed hospital and a shooting range. The shelter extends under each of the many wings of the school, gymnasium, and auditorium. Former mechanical drawing teacher Audie Watts was the Civil Defense Coordinator for the area and was in charge of the shelter.

The school boasts an expeller JROTC program that is led by Army 1SG (ret) John K. Lunsford and Army SGM (ret) Gary L. Ortega Sr. The AHS Army JROTC was selected to present our national colors at an NFL Oakland Raiders game at the Raiders Coliseum.

References

External links

 
 School Accountability Report Card 2010-2011
 Institute of Education Sciences - Arvin High School 2010-2011 school year data

Public high schools in California
1949 establishments in California